Nicolas Deschamps (born at Villefranche, Rhône, France, 1797; died at Aix-en-Provence, 1872) was a French Jesuit controversial writer.

Life

He entered the Society of Jesus in 1826; taught literature and rhetoric in several colleges and wrote extensively.

Works
Apart from a few didactic and devotional books, like "Cours élémentaire de littérature" (Avignon, 1860) and "Les fleurs de Marie" (Paris, 1863), his works are largely polemical. They and bear on burning questions of politics and religion  in the France of his day: the educational monopoly of the University of France; the state faculties of theology; the Organic Articles; liberty of association; Communism; the issue of paganism in classical education.

Best known is Les Sociétés secrètes published after the author's death (Avignon, 1874–1876), re-edited and brought up to date by Claudio Janet (Paris, 1880 and 1881). Deschamps saw in European Freemasonry, whose origins he traced back to Manichæism, a baneful force. It worked, he claimed, under the cover of philanthropy, but against religion, the social order, patriotism, and even morality.

References

Attribution
 The entry cites:
Sommervogel, Bibl. de la c. de J., II, 1956; 
Janet, introd. to his edition of Les Sociétés secrètes;
Polybiblion (1874 and 1876).

1797 births
1872 deaths
Anti-Masonry
19th-century French Jesuits
French male writers